Christopher McKinney (born 19 March 1950) is a Bahamian sailor. He competed in the Dragon event at the 1972 Summer Olympics.

References

External links
 

1950 births
Living people
Bahamian male sailors (sport)
Olympic sailors of the Bahamas
Sailors at the 1972 Summer Olympics – Dragon
Place of birth missing (living people)